The Great Britain men's national under-18 ice hockey team is the men's national under-18 ice hockey team of Great Britain. The team is controlled by Ice Hockey UK, a member of the International Ice Hockey Federation. The team represents Great Britain at the IIHF World U18 Championships.

International competitions

IIHF World U18 Championships

External links
Great Britain at IIHF.com

I
National under-18 ice hockey teams